is a science fiction anime series created by Tetsuji Suzukawa and Eiji Tanaka and animated by Knack Productions (now ICHI Corporation). It was directed by Noboru Miura and written by Masaaki Wakuda, Toyohiro Andō and Yoshio Tamado, with the characters designed by Tanaka. A total of 65 episodes were broadcast in syndication on TBS from April 1 to June 28, 1974, in 10-minute slots from 5:30 to 5:40 PM, Monday through Friday. Each episode of the series is a self-contained story. Discotek Media currently licenses the series outside Japan.

Plot
The story takes place in the year 2074, in a futuristic city where science has developed by leaps and bounds, and the Juralian aliens are planning to invade Earth. 10-year-old Ken Izumi, disguises himself as Chargeman and struggles to protect the Earth from the threat of the Juralians.

Characters

Izumi family
 
voiced by Setsuko Takemoto
 The protagonist of the franchise, a 5th grader at Yoi primary school, somewhere in Japan.  Ken is extremely powerful, able to inflict debilitating punches on a Juralian who has been credibly disguised as a boxing champion.  He has the ability to transform into Chargeman Ken when exposed to even a minuscule amount of light, though the total lack of it has prevented him from transforming several times. As Chargeman Ken, he has the mount Sky Rod and carries the Alpha Gun, both of which can instantly kill Juralians by a beam-like attack, and wears the Vizum Belt that can make a lethal vortex of wind. He kills Juralians indiscriminately, even if they are not attacking or are running away.  There are several instances of his dispensing with large amounts of hostages in ruthless attacks on Juralian fortifications and transports.  Ken's only admitted weakness per se is mathematics, but his hatred for tomato juice has been used to identify his imposter.

 
 Ken's 7-year-old sister.  She has compassion for animals and is often supportive of her brother.

 
 voiced by Fuyuki Takahashi
 Ken's robot companion.

  
voiced by Kiyoshi Kawanishi
 Ken and Caron's father.  He is described as a physician, though he has never been shown practicing medicine in the anime series.  Indeed, his wife has forgotten his profession, and he himself commented on a mental hospital in a derogatory fashion.

  
voiced by Yuki Aida
 Ken and Caron's mother and Hiroshi's wife.

Juralians
 
voiced by Noboru Sato
 The chief antagonist of the franchise, leader of the Juralians invading Earth. Atypical for Juralians, Maou has two eyes.

 
 Juralians are vaguely humanoid, maroon-colored, with a slim waist, broad chest, long, tentacle-like limbs, and have a single eye capable of emitting a beam-like attack that can disintegrate any life form it hits and do severe damage to structural members of buildings and towers.  They have the ability to transform into other lifeforms, such as humans or horses.  Juralians do not have reflections in mirrors, a characteristic used by Ken and other protagonists to distinguish them from humans and robots.

Episode list

Production and cult status
Chargeman Ken! features several staff from Astroganger, including Seiichi Nishino, Eiji Tanaka, Toyohiro Andō, and Hiromichi Mogaki. As a result, the anime features similar character designs, story composition and characterization.

According to Nishino, the show was produced with the aim of depicting life in the future, based on an illustrated futuristic story by Hiroshi Manabe. The average budget for a 30-minute anime episode by 1974 ranged from 4 to 5 million yen, but Chargeman Ken! was produced on 500,000 yen per episode. The low budget caused Knack Productions's staff to become apathetic toward the show and largely skip work on it in favor of going to the beach. Much information about the show is still unknown, including the voice actors, who are only listed as "Kindaiza Troupe" (劇団近代座 Gekidan Kindaiza).

Chargeman Ken! remained obscure until 2007, when a two-part DVD box set was released by Line Communications, with the episodes collected on a different order from the initial broadcast. The series became a viral hit on 2channel and Niconico, which found unintentional comedic value in the show's flaws—including opportunistic and incoherent storytelling, poor pacing, animation inconsistencies, poor voice acting, and artifacts including hairs that appear on the film. It then became an Internet meme, leading to dozens of video remixes and AMVs. On August 20, 2010, almost 40 years after the original broadcast, the first official website for the anime was opened, and on October 27, 2010, the official soundtrack and tribute album "Chargeman Ken! Tribute to Soundtracks vol.1" was released. In response to the boom on the Internet, the show was rebroadcast on AT-X from 2008 to 2009, and on Kids Station from July 2011 to January 2012, with the airing order being the same as that of the original broadcast. Discotek Media released the entire series on DVD in North America on October 31, 2017.

A stage musical based on the series ran from October 31 to November 6, 2019, at Shinjuku FACE in Tokyo. The second musical was staged at Shinjuku FACE in Tokyo from October 10 to October 18, 2020.

On August 3, 2020, ICHI, the production company of the anime, started a crowdfunding campaign on Readyfor to restore and archive the original film reels, which had deteriorated significantly over the years. A Blu-ray box of the show, published by Best Field, was released on June 30, 2021. The release includes all 65 episodes of the anime, including a bonus DVD containing ICHI's pilot films and a slideshow of the characters' model sheets, as well as a booklet featuring an interview with the producer.

References

External links

Chargeman Ken! The Complete Series - Discotek Media

1974 anime television series debuts
1974 Japanese television series endings
Japanese children's animated science fiction television series
Knack Productions
Science fiction anime and manga
TBS Television (Japan) original programming
Discotek Media
Internet memes introduced in 2007
Film and television memes